The 2021 Michigan Tech Huskies football team represented Michigan Tech University during the 2021 NCAA Division II football season. The Huskies competed as members of the Great Lakes Intercollegiate Athletic Conference (GLIAC) and played their home games at Kearly Stadium in Houghton, Michigan. This was the program's fifth season under head coach Steve Olson.

Previous season
The Huskies didn't compete in the 2020 season due to the GLIAC cancelling the season due to the ongoing COVID-19 pandemic.

Preseason

Preseason GLIAC poll
The Huskies stand 5th in the GLIAC Preseason Coaches Poll, leading rival Northern Michigan (7th).

Personnel

Coaching staff

Schedule

Source

Rankings

Game summaries

Hillsdale

St. Thomas

No. 9 Grand Valley State

Davenport

Wayne State (MI)

Northern Michigan

For the 11th straight season, Michigan Tech took home the Miner's Cup. During their winning streak, Michigan Tech beat the Wildcats by an average of 8.6 points per game, or an average total of 30.1-21.5 per game. This victory is the largest since a 28-21 victory in 2017. Since 2002, the start of the Miner's Cup, Michigan Tech is 16-3 against the Wildcats, averaging a 31.5-22.2 win per game, or a 9.3 point margin of victory. Michigan Tech has outscored Northern Michigan 599-421 in this series.

No. 1 Ferris State

No. 8 Grand Valley State

Northwood

In impressive fashion, Michigan Tech was not only able to get their first shutout win since November 13, 2010 (a 21-0 win against Northern Michigan), but the Huskies were also able to not only intercept the ball at an important spot in this victory, but also return it all of 100 yards for a touchdown as the last scoring play of the game.

Saginaw Valley State

References

Michigan Tech
Michigan Tech Huskies football seasons
Michigan Tech Huskies football